The 1988–89 NBA season was the Rockets' 22nd season in the NBA and 18th season in the city of Houston. Houston hosted the All-Star Game this season. During the off-season, the Rockets acquired Otis Thorpe from the Sacramento Kings, signed free agent Mike Woodson, and hired Don Chaney as their new head coach. The Rockets posted a six-game winning streak in December, and held a 28–18 record at the All-Star break. Despite a 7-game losing streak between February and March, the team finished second in the Midwest Division with a 45–37 record. 

Akeem Olajuwon averaged 24.8 points, 13.5 rebounds and 3.4 blocks per game, and was named to the All-NBA First Team, and selected for the 1989 NBA All-Star Game. In addition, Thorpe averaged 16.7 points and 9.6 rebounds per game, while Sleepy Floyd contributed 14.2 points, 8.6 assists and 1.5 steals per game, Woodson provided the team with 12.9 points per game, and Buck Johnson contributed 9.6 points per game. Olajuwon also finished in fifth place in Most Valuable Player voting, and in second place in Defensive Player of the Year voting.

In the playoffs, the Rockets lost to the Seattle SuperSonics in four games in the Western Conference First Round. Following the season, Purvis Short signed as a free agent with the New Jersey Nets.

Draft picks

Roster

Regular season

Season standings

z – clinched division title
y – clinched division title
x – clinched playoff spot

Record vs. opponents

Game log

Regular season

|- align="center" bgcolor="#ffcccc"
| 1
| November 4, 1988
| @ Denver
| L 117–120
|
|
|
| McNichols Sports Arena
| 0–1
|- align="center" bgcolor="#ffcccc"
| 2
| November 5, 1988
| Dallas
| L 113–114 (OT)
|
|
|
| The Summit
| 0–2
|- align="center" bgcolor="#ccffcc"
| 3
| November 8, 1988
| San Antonio
| W 120–102
|
|
|
| The Summit
| 1–2
|- align="center" bgcolor="#ccffcc"
| 4
| November 10, 1988
| Utah
| W 106–99
|
|
|
| The Summit
| 2–2
|- align="center" bgcolor="#ccffcc"
| 5
| November 11, 1988
| @ Miami
| W 121–100
|
|
|
| Miami Arena
| 3–2
|- align="center" bgcolor="#ccffcc"
| 6
| November 13, 1988
| Sacramento
| W 129–127
|
|
|
| The Summit
| 4–2
|- align="center" bgcolor="#ffcccc"
| 7
| November 15, 1988
| New York
| L 121–126
|
|
|
| The Summit
| 4–3
|- align="center" bgcolor="#ccffcc"
| 8
| November 17, 1988
| Miami
| W 113–107
|
|
|
| The Summit
| 5–3
|- align="center" bgcolor="#ccffcc"
| 9
| November 19, 1988
| Detroit
| W 109–98
|
|
|
| The Summit
| 6–3
|- align="center" bgcolor="#ccffcc"
| 10
| November 21, 1988
| Atlanta
| W 117–113
|
|
|
| The Summit
| 7–3
|- align="center" bgcolor="#ffcccc"
| 11
| November 23, 1988
| @ Utah
| L 99–102
|
|
|
| Salt Palace
| 7–4
|- align="center" bgcolor="#ffcccc"
| 12
| November 25, 1988
| @ Portland
| L 94–111
|
|
|
| Memorial Coliseum
| 7–5
|- align="center" bgcolor="#ccffcc"
| 13
| November 26, 1988
| @ Golden State
| W 119–109
|
|
|
| Oakland-Alameda County Coliseum Arena
| 8–5
|- align="center" bgcolor="#ffcccc"
| 14
| November 29, 1988
| Phoenix
| L 107–124
|
|
|
| The Summit
| 8–6
|- align="center" bgcolor="#ccffcc"
| 15
| November 30, 1988
| @ Dallas
| W 101–89
|
|
|
| Reunion Arena
| 9–6

|- align="center" bgcolor="#ffcccc"
| 16
| December 2, 1988
| @ Phoenix
| L 95–110
|
|
|
| Arizona Veterans Memorial Coliseum
| 9–7
|- align="center" bgcolor="#ccffcc"
| 17
| December 3, 1988
| Charlotte
| W 108–104
|
|
|
| The Summit
| 10–7
|- align="center" bgcolor="#ccffcc"
| 18
| December 6, 1988
| Cleveland
| W 106–105
|
|
|
| The Summit
| 11–7
|- align="center" bgcolor="#ffcccc"
| 19
| December 8, 1988
| @ L.A. Clippers
| L 116–120
|
|
|
| Los Angeles Memorial Sports Arena
| 11–8
|- align="center" bgcolor="#ccffcc"
| 20
| December 10, 1988
| Seattle
| W 110–91
|
|
|
| The Summit
| 12–8
|- align="center" bgcolor="#ffcccc"
| 21
| December 13, 1988
| @ Denver
| L 101–126
|
|
|
| McNichols Sports Arena
| 12–9
|- align="center" bgcolor="#ccffcc"
| 22
| December 15, 1988
| Golden State
| W 124–115 (2OT)
|
|
|
| The Summit
| 13–9
|- align="center" bgcolor="#ccffcc"
| 23
| December 18, 1988
| San Antonio
| W 120–109
|
|
|
| The Summit
| 14–9
|- align="center" bgcolor="#ccffcc"
| 24
| December 20, 1988
| Sacramento
| W 105–104
|
|
|
| The Summit
| 15–9
|- align="center" bgcolor="#ccffcc"
| 25
| December 22, 1988
| L.A. Clippers
| W 125–109
|
|
|
| The Summit
| 16–9
|- align="center" bgcolor="#ccffcc"
| 26
| December 26, 1988
| @ Charlotte
| W 97–95
|
|
|
| Charlotte Coliseum
| 17–9
|- align="center" bgcolor="#ccffcc"
| 27
| December 27, 1988
| @ Miami
| W 101–93
|
|
|
| Miami Arena
| 18–9
|- align="center" bgcolor="#ffcccc"
| 28
| December 29, 1988
| @ Washington
| L 109–126
|
|
|
| Capital Centre
| 18–10
|- align="center" bgcolor="#ffcccc"
| 29
| December 30, 1988
| @ Detroit
| L 83–95
|
|
|
| The Palace of Auburn Hills
| 18–11

|- align="center" bgcolor="#ccffcc"
| 30
| January 3, 1989
| Utah
| W 104–102
|
|
|
| The Summit
| 19–11
|- align="center" bgcolor="#ffcccc"
| 31
| January 7, 1989
| Philadelphia
| L 95–96
|
|
|
| The Summit
| 19–12
|- align="center" bgcolor="#ccffcc"
| 32
| January 11, 1989
| @ San Antonio
| W 122–117 (OT)
|
|
|
| HemisFair Arena
| 20–12
|- align="center" bgcolor="#ccffcc"
| 33
| January 12, 1989
| Portland
| W 116–106
|
|
|
| The Summit
| 21–12
|- align="center" bgcolor="#ccffcc"
| 34
| January 14, 1989
| Dallas
| W 110–98
|
|
|
| The Summit
| 22–12
|- align="center" bgcolor="#ffcccc"
| 35
| January 16, 1989
| @ L.A. Lakers
| L 113–124
|
|
|
| Great Western Forum
| 22–13
|- align="center" bgcolor="#ffcccc"
| 36
| January 17, 1989
| @ Sacramento
| L 109–123
|
|
|
| ARCO Arena
| 22–14
|- align="center" bgcolor="#ffcccc"
| 37
| January 19, 1989
| @ Seattle
| L 108–124
|
|
|
| Seattle Center Coliseum
| 22–15
|- align="center" bgcolor="#ffcccc"
| 38
| January 20, 1989
| @ Golden State
| L 114–121
|
|
|
| Oakland-Alameda County Coliseum Arena
| 22–16
|- align="center" bgcolor="#ccffcc"
| 39
| January 24, 1989
| Miami
| W 118–93
|
|
|
| The Summit
| 23–16
|- align="center" bgcolor="#ccffcc"
| 40
| January 26, 1989
| L.A. Clippers
| W 106–100
|
|
|
| The Summit
| 24–16
|- align="center" bgcolor="#ccffcc"
| 42
| January 28, 1989
| @ San Antonio
| W 96–91
|
|
|
| HemisFair Arena
| 25–17
|- align="center" bgcolor="#ffcccc"
| 42
| January 31, 1989
| L.A. Lakers
| L 114–125
|
|
|
| The Summit
| 25–17

|- align="center" bgcolor="#ccffcc"
| 43
| February 3, 1989
| Chicago
| W 105–98
|
|
|
| The Summit
| 26–17
|- align="center" bgcolor="#ccffcc"
| 44
| February 5, 1989
| Denver
| W 124–112
|
|
|
| The Summit
| 27–17
|- align="center" bgcolor="#ffcccc"
| 45
| February 8, 1989
| @ L.A. Clippers
| L 111–114
|
|
|
| Los Angeles Memorial Sports Arena
| 27–18
|- align="center" bgcolor="#ccffcc"
| 46
| February 9, 1989
| @ Portland
| W 113–110
|
|
|
| Memorial Coliseum
| 28–18
|- align="center"
|colspan="9" bgcolor="#bbcaff"|All-Star Break
|- style="background:#cfc;"
|- bgcolor="#bbffbb"
|- align="center" bgcolor="#ccffcc"
| 47
| February 14, 1989
| Boston
| W 137–123
|
|
|
| The Summit
| 29–18
|- align="center" bgcolor="#ccffcc"
| 48
| February 17, 1989
| Denver
| W 121–111
|
|
|
| The Summit
| 30–18
|- align="center" bgcolor="#ccffcc"
| 49
| February 18, 1989
| @ Dallas
| W 105–94
|
|
|
| Reunion Arena
| 31–18
|- align="center" bgcolor="#ffcccc"
| 50
| February 20, 1989
| @ Cleveland
| L 90–110
|
|
|
| Richfield Coliseum
| 31–19
|- align="center" bgcolor="#ffcccc"
| 51
| February 21, 1989
| @ New York
| L 115–120
|
|
|
| Madison Square Garden
| 31–20
|- align="center" bgcolor="#ffcccc"
| 52
| February 24, 1989
| @ Chicago
| L 97–106
|
|
|
| Chicago Stadium
| 31–21
|- align="center" bgcolor="#ffcccc"
| 53
| February 25, 1989
| @ Milwaukee
| L 105–121
|
|
|
| Bradley Center
| 31–22
|- align="center" bgcolor="#ffcccc"
| 54
| February 27, 1989
| Washington
| L 98–104
|
|
|
| The Summit
| 31–23

|- align="center" bgcolor="#ffcccc"
| 55
| March 2, 1989
| @ Denver
| L 103–113
|
|
|
| McNichols Sports Arena
| 31–24
|- align="center" bgcolor="#ffcccc"
| 56
| March 3, 1989
| @ Seattle
| L 108–118
|
|
|
| Seattle Center Coliseum
| 31–25
|- align="center" bgcolor="#ccffcc"
| 57
| March 5, 1989
| L.A. Lakers
| W 88–83
|
|
|
| The Summit
| 32–25
|- align="center" bgcolor="#ffcccc"
| 58
| March 8, 1989
| @ Utah
| L 80–117
|
|
|
| Salt Palace
| 32–26
|- align="center" bgcolor="#ccffcc"
| 59
| March 10, 1989
| Dallas
| W 96–86
|
|
|
| The Summit
| 33–26
|- align="center" bgcolor="#ccffcc"
| 60
| March 11, 1989
| New Jersey
| W 124–94
|
|
|
| The Summit
| 34–26
|- align="center" bgcolor="#ffcccc"
| 61
| March 13, 1989
| @ L.A. Lakers
| L 96–97
|
|
|
| Great Western Forum
| 34–27
|- align="center" bgcolor="#ffcccc"
| 62
| March 14, 1989
| @ Sacramento
| L 90–95
|
|
|
| ARCO Arena
| 34–28
|- align="center" bgcolor="#ccffcc"
| 63
| March 16, 1989
| Milwaukee
| W 120–104
|
|
|
| The Summit
| 35–28
|- align="center" bgcolor="#ccffcc"
| 64
| March 18, 1989
| Portland
| W 127–113
|
|
|
| The Summit
| 36–28
|- align="center" bgcolor="#ffcccc"
| 65
| March 21, 1989
| Denver
| L 110–112
|
|
|
| The Summit
| 36–29
|- align="center" bgcolor="#ffcccc"
| 66
| March 24, 1989
| Utah
| L 99–102
|
|
|
| The Summit
| 36–30
|- align="center" bgcolor="#ccffcc"
| 67
| March 25, 1989
| Golden State
| W 144–104
|
|
|
| The Summit
| 37–30
|- align="center" bgcolor="#ccffcc"
| 68
| March 28, 1989
| Seattle
| W 120–117
|
|
|
| The Summit
| 38–30
|- align="center" bgcolor="#ccffcc"
| 69
| March 30, 1989
| @ New Jersey
| W 109–101
|
|
|
| Brendan Byrne Arena
| 39–30
|- align="center" bgcolor="#ffcccc"
| 70
| March 31, 1989
| @ Boston
| L 109–126
|
|
|
| Boston Garden
| 39–31

|- align="center" bgcolor="#ffcccc"
| 71
| April 2, 1989
| @ Philadelphia
| L 99–108
|
|
|
| The Spectrum
| 39–32
|- align="center" bgcolor="#ccffcc"
| 72
| April 4, 1989
| @ Indiana
| W 90–88
|
|
|
| Market Square Arena
| 40–32
|- align="center" bgcolor="#ffcccc"
| 73
| April 7, 1989
| @ Atlanta
| L 112–120 (OT)
|
|
|
| The Omni
| 40–33
|- align="center" bgcolor="#ffcccc"
| 74
| April 8, 1989
| @ Miami
| L 104–107 (OT)
|
|
|
| Miami Arena
| 40–34
|- align="center" bgcolor="#ccffcc"
| 75
| April 11, 1989
| Indiana
| W 108–99
|
|
|
| The Summit
| 41–35
|- align="center" bgcolor="#ffcccc"
| 76
| April 13, 1989
| Phoenix
| L 111–119
|
|
|
| The Summit
| 41–35
|- align="center" bgcolor="#ffcccc"
| 77
| April 14, 1989
| @ Utah
| L 96–122
|
|
|
| Salt Palace
| 41–36
|- align="center" bgcolor="#ccffcc"
| 78
| April 16, 1989
| @ Dallas
| W 114–112 (OT)
|
|
|
| Reunion Arena
| 42–36
|- align="center" bgcolor="#ccffcc"
| 79
| April 17, 1989
| San Antonio
| W 99–91
|
|
|
| The Summit
| 43–36
|- align="center" bgcolor="#ccffcc"
| 80
| April 19, 1989
| @ San Antonio
| W 99–84
|
|
|
| HemisFair Arena
| 44–36
|- align="center" bgcolor="#ccffcc"
| 81
| April 21, 1989
| @ Phoenix
| W 112–101
|
|
|
| Arizona Veterans Memorial Coliseum
| 45–36
|- align="center" bgcolor="#ffcccc"
| 82
| April 22, 1989
| Miami
| L 89–91
|
|
|
| The Summit
| 45–37

Playoffs

|- align="center" bgcolor="#ffcccc"
| 1
| April 28, 1989
| @ Seattle
| L 107–111
| Akeem Olajuwon (28)
| Akeem Olajuwon (9)
| Sleepy Floyd (7)
| Seattle Center Coliseum14,250
| 0–1
|- align="center" bgcolor="#ffcccc"
| 2
| April 30, 1989
| @ Seattle
| L 97–109
| Akeem Olajuwon (30)
| Akeem Olajuwon (12)
| Sleepy Floyd (6)
| Seattle Center Coliseum12,887
| 0–2
|- align="center" bgcolor="#ccffcc"
| 3
| May 3, 1989
| Seattle
| W 126–107
| Sleepy Floyd (28)
| Akeem Olajuwon (18)
| Sleepy Floyd (6)
| The Summit16,611
| 1–2
|- align="center" bgcolor="#ffcccc"
| 4
| May 5, 1989
| Seattle
| L 96–98
| Akeem Olajuwon (24)
| Akeem Olajuwon (13)
| Floyd, Woodson (7)
| The Summit16,611
| 1–3
|-

Player statistics

Season

Playoffs

Awards and records
Akeem Olajuwon, All-NBA First Team

Transactions

References

See also
1988–89 NBA season

Houston Rockets seasons